Qerkh Bolagh (also Romanized as Qerkh Bolāgh and Qarakh Bolāgh; also known as Gharakhbolagh, Kirkh Bulāk, Kirkh Bulāq, and Qīkh Bolagh) is a village in Baba Jik Rural District, in the Central District of Chaldoran County, West Azerbaijan Province, Iran. At the 2006 census, its population was 231, in 52 families.

References 

Populated places in Chaldoran County